Saint-René-de-Matane is a municipality in Quebec, Canada.

In addition to main population centre of Saint-René located along Quebec Route 195, the municipality also includes the communities of Le Renversé, Rivière-Matane, Ruisseau-Gagnon, and Village-à-Dancause.

Demographics

Population

See also
 List of municipalities in Quebec

References

Incorporated places in Bas-Saint-Laurent
Municipalities in Quebec